The 2021 Campeonato Brasileiro Série C was a football competition held in Brazil, equivalent to the third division. It began on 29 May and ended on 20 November 2021.

Twenty teams competed in the tournament, twelve returning from the 2020 season, four promoted from the 2020 Campeonato Brasileiro Série D (Altos, Floresta, Mirassol and Novorizontino) and four relegated from the 2020 Campeonato Brasileiro Série B (Botafogo-SP, Figueirense, Oeste and Paraná).

Criciúma, Ituano, Novorizontino and Tombense were promoted to the 2022 Campeonato Brasileiro Série B.

Ituano defeated Tombense 4–1 on aggregate in the finals to win their second title.

Format
In the first stage, the teams were divided into two groups of ten teams each. Each group was played on a home-and-away round-robin basis. The top four teams of each group advanced to the second stage.

In the second stage, the teams were divided into two groups of four teams each. Each group was played on a home-and-away round-robin basis. The top two teams of each group were promoted to the Série B, while the group winners qualified for the finals.

Teams

Number of teams by state

Personnel and kits

Managerial changes

Notes

First stage
In the first stage, each group was played on a home-and-away round-robin basis. The teams were ranked according to points (3 points for a win, 1 point for a draw, and 0 points for a loss). If tied on points, the following criteria would be used to determine the ranking: 1. Wins; 2. Goal difference; 3. Goals scored; 4. Head-to-head (if the tie is only between two teams); 5. Fewest red cards; 6. Fewest yellow cards; 7. Draw in the headquarters of the Brazilian Football Confederation (Regulations Article 15).

The top four teams of each group advanced to the second stage.

Group A

Results

Group B

Results

Second stage
In the second stage, each group was played on a home-and-away round-robin basis. The teams were ranked according to points (3 points for a win, 1 point for a draw, and 0 points for a loss). If tied on points, the criteria to determine the ranking would be the same as used in the first stage (Regulations Article 19).

The top two teams of each group were promoted to the Série B. Group winners advanced to the finals.

Group C

Results

Group D

Results

Finals
The finals were played on a home-and-away two-legged basis, with the higher-seeded team hosting the second leg. If tied on aggregate, the away goals rule would not be used, extra time would not be played, and the penalty shoot-out would be used to determine the champions (Regulations Article 20).

The finalists were seeded according to their performance in the tournament. The teams were ranked according to overall points. If tied on overall points, the following criteria would be used to determine the ranking: 1. Overall wins; 2. Overall goal difference; 3. Overall goals scored; 4. Fewest red cards in the tournament; 5. Fewest yellow cards in the tournament; 6. Draw in the headquarters of the Brazilian Football Confederation (Regulations Article 21).

The matches were played on 13 and 20 November 2021.

|}

Matches

Top goalscorers

References

Campeonato Brasileiro Série C seasons
3